Live at the North Sea Jazz Festival is a live album by jazz musician Freddie Hubbard released on the Pablo label which features performances by Hubbard, David Schnitter, Billy Childs, Larry Klein and Sinclair Lott recorded at the North Sea Jazz Festival, The Hague, the Netherlands on July 12, 1980.

Track listing
 "First Light" - 16:32
 "One of Another Kind" - 12:47
 "One of a Kind" - 10:30
 "Impressions" (Coltrane) - 11:52
 "Happiness Is Now" - 12:21
 "Red Clay" - 9:34
All compositions by Freddie Hubbard except as indicated
 Recorded live at the North Sea Jazz Festival, The Hague, Netherlands on July 12, 1980.

Personnel
 Freddie Hubbard: trumpet
 David Schnitter: tenor saxophone, flute
 Billy Childs: keyboards
 Larry Klein: bass
 Sinclair Lott: drums

References

1980 live albums
Freddie Hubbard live albums
Pablo Records live albums